"The Night" is a song by the Animals. It was released as the first single from their 1983 Ark reunion effort.

It is the band's first and only Billboard Hot 100 entry since 1968, peaking at No. 48. It is also their only entry on the Mainstream Rock Tracks chart, peaking at No. 34.

Background
Eric Burdon wrote this song with John Sterling, who gave it to him after he wrote the initial music and lyrics about his wife Eva who was visiting her family in Sweden. John talked with her on the phone every night during her absence.

The video clip for MTV was shot on July 21, 1983. The complete line-up is featured there.

Chart performance

References

Songs about nights
1983 singles
The Animals songs
Songs written by Eric Burdon
I.R.S. Records singles
Song recordings produced by Stephen Lipson